Jan Jarota (born 9 December 1953 in Łomża) is a Polish politician. He was elected to the Sejm on 25 September 2005, getting 3763 votes in 24 Białystok district as a candidate from the League of Polish Families list.

See also
Members of Polish Sejm 2005-2007

External links
Jan Jarota - parliamentary page - includes declarations of interest, voting record, and transcripts of speeches.

1953 births
Cardinal Stefan Wyszyński University in Warsaw alumni
Living people
People from Łomża
Polish veterinarians
Members of the Polish Sejm 2005–2007
League of Polish Families politicians
University of Warmia and Mazury in Olsztyn alumni